Carmacks Airport  is located  from the community of Carmacks, Yukon, Canada.

References

External links
Page about this airport on COPA's Places to Fly airport directory

Registered aerodromes in Yukon